"Molnljus" is a Swedish language song by singer William Stridh. The song was performed for the first time in Melodifestivalen 2020. The song was written by Christian Holmström, David Kreuger, Markus Lidén and Stridh himself. It was produced by Holmström, Lidén and Kreuger. It peaked at number 50 on the Swedish Singles Chart.

Charts

References

2020 debut singles
2020 singles
English-language Swedish songs
Melodifestivalen songs of 2020
Swedish pop songs
Songs written by David Kreuger